Kick is an Australian television series that was first broadcast on 9 June 2007 on SBS TV. It is set in Brunswick in Melbourne, Australia. The series follows the adventures of wild twenty-something Miki Mavros who is forced to move back in with her Greek-Australian parents on Hope Street after a failed attempt to "make it big". Miki begins work as a secretary for suave Anglo-Indian Dr. Joe Mangeshkar, who has a girlfriend named Jan, and things spiral out of control. Miki manages a local neighbourhood soccer team, hence the series title Kick.

The show also follows the adventures of Miki's neighbours on Hope Street, including the Salim family, a Lebanese-Australian Muslim family with siblings Amen, Osama  "Ozzie", Taghred and Layla. Amen is an aspiring businessman with questionable ethics. Osama is going through typical teenage angst and has a crush on Taghred's friend Tatiana. Taghred is an aspiring soccer star. Layla is a university student arranged to be married to Sharif, but everything changes when Layla falls for fellow fencer Jackie.

The first season of the show is available on DVD.

Season one

Cast
 Zoe Ventoura as Miki Mavros
 Raji James as Joe Mangeshkar
 George Kapiniaris as Takis Mavros
 Maria Mercedes as Dora Mavros
 Anh Do as Hoa Tran
 Damien Fotiou as Nico Angelidis
 Firass Dirani as Amen Salim
 Nicole Chamoun as Layla Salim
 Stephen Lopez as Osama "Ozzie" Salim
 Craig Menaud as Ravi Mangeshkar
 Mauricio Merino Jr as Justin Haz
 Romi Trower as Jackie Schneider
 Kat Stewart as Jan Pollock
 Alex Menglet as Zoran Baranoff
 Nadja Kostich as Martina Baranoff
 Natasha Cunningham as Tatiana Baranoff
 Osamah Sami as Sharif Doumani
 Rebecca Asha as Guest Cast

See also
 List of Australian television series
 List of television shows with LGBT characters

External links
 Official site
 
 Interview with Zoe Ventoura, star of Kick!
 Interview with Nicole Chamoun, Layla on Kick!

2007 Australian television series debuts
Australian comedy television series
Australian LGBT-related television shows
Special Broadcasting Service original programming
Television shows set in Victoria (Australia)
2007 Australian television series endings